The Democratic Republic of the Congo competed at the 2010 Summer Youth Olympics, the inaugural Youth Olympic Games, held in Singapore from 14 August to 26 August 2010.

Medalists

Athletics

Boys
Track and road events

Fencing

Group Stage

Knock-Out Stage

Judo

Individual

Team

Taekwondo

Volleyball

References

External links
Competitors List: Democratic Republic of the Congo – Singapore 2010 official site

You
Nations at the 2010 Summer Youth Olympics
Democratic Republic of the Congo at the Youth Olympics